Stanisław Stwosz, also  Stanislaw Stoss, Stanislas Stack, (1478–1528) was a Polish sculptor.

Stwosz was born in Kraków, the son of the sculptor Veit Stoss. He is credited with authorship of King John I Albert's tombstone in the chapel. Corpus Christi in the Wawel Cathedral (along with Jörg Huber of Passau). He is the author of a triptych depicting St. Stanislaus in 1504 on the south porch entrance to St. Mary's Basilica, Kraków (the preserved part) and the King John I Albert triptych located in the Chapel of the Cathedral of the Czartoryski family. He made a sculpture depicting a scene of the Dormition of the Mother of God for the Corpus Christi Church in Biecz.

References

Polish sculptors
Polish male sculptors
1528 deaths
1478 births
Artists from Kraków